The 2020 Perth Lynx season is the 35th season for the franchise in the Women's National Basketball League (WNBL).

The 2020 season will mark the first season with Ryan Petrik as head coach, after he overtook the role from Andy Stewart who spent five seasons in the position. In November 2020, the Lynx announced that local mining and development company, Westgold Resources Limited, would serve as naming rights partners for the upcoming season.

Due to the COVID-19 pandemic, a North Queensland hub is set to host the season. The season was originally 2020–21 and would be traditionally played over several months across the summer, however this seasons scheduling has been condensed. The six-week season will see Townsville, Cairns and Mackay host a 56-game regular season fixture, plus a four-game final series (2 x semi-finals, preliminary final and grand final). Each team will contest 14 games starting on 12 November, with the grand final scheduled for 20 December.

Roster

Standings

Results

Regular season

References

External links
Perth Lynx Official website

2020 WNBL season
WNBL seasons by team
Basketball,Perth Lynx
2020 in basketball
Australia,Perth Lynx
2020–21 in Australian basketball